Chantal Lynch (born 16 August 1993) is a Canadian-raised Guyanese former footballer who played as a defender. She has been a member of the Guyana women's national team.

Early life
Lynch was raised in Toronto, Ontario.

High school and college career
Lynch attended the Senator O'Connor College School. After graduating there, she joined the Southern University in Baton Rouge, Louisiana, United States.

International career
Lynch capped for Guyana at senior level during the 2010 CONCACAF Women's World Cup Qualifying qualification.

See also
List of Guyana women's international footballers

References

1993 births
Living people
Women's association football defenders
Guyanese women's footballers
Guyana women's international footballers
Southern Jaguars and Lady Jaguars athletes
Guyanese expatriate footballers
Guyanese expatriate sportspeople in the United States
Expatriate women's soccer players in the United States
Canadian women's soccer players
Soccer players from Toronto
Black Canadian women's soccer players
Canadian sportspeople of Guyanese descent
Canadian expatriate women's soccer players
Canadian expatriate sportspeople in the United States